William Edward Ebben (born October 7, 1935) is an American former professional basketball player. Ebben was selected in the 1957 NBA Draft (third round, 18th overall) by the Detroit Pistons after a collegiate career at the University of Detroit Mercy. He appeared in eight NBA games in his career and averaged 1.9 points, 1.0 rebounds and 0.5 assists per game.

See also
 List of NCAA Division I men's basketball players with 30 or more rebounds in a game

References

1935 births
Living people
All-American college men's basketball players
American men's basketball players
Basketball players from Illinois
Detroit Pistons draft picks
Detroit Pistons players
Detroit Mercy Titans men's basketball players
Guards (basketball)